Actinopus dubiomaculatus is a species of mygalomorph spiders in the family Actinopodidae. It is found Brazil.

References

dubiomaculatus
Spiders described in 1923